Bayarán is a 2003 Filipino action drama film directed by Francis Posadas. Written by Jerry Gracio, the film introduces Jay Manalo as the deaf-mute hired killer protagonist, Jake.

Plot

Cast
Jay Manalo as Jake
Maricar de Mesa as Rizza
Carlos Morales as Spike
Kristel Venecia as Millet
Daria Ramirez as Aling Melay
Ricardo Cepeda as Bogart
John Apacible as Douglas
Trishia Jacob as Yvonne
Ruby Europa as Ruby
Cloyd Robinson as Mama Cita
Jess Sanchez as James
Archie Adamos as Mr. Ramos
Robert Miller as Pusher
Michael Anthony Cesar as Buyer
Mar Mendez as Bouncer
Simon Pulmano as Young Jake
Aaron Rodran as Teenager Jake
Tita Swarding as Mama

Production 
The post-production facilities were made at Sampaguita Studio, while the titles are made at A & J Concepts. The film was shot at Angono, Rizal, Baguio, Binangonan, Caloocan, Imus and Manila.

Awards 
On the 2004 FAMAS Awards, the film has received the Best Actor for Jay Manalo.

Reception 
As of February 9, 2017, the film held a score of 5,0 out of 10 from the users at the Internet Movie Database.

References

External links

2003 films
Philippine action drama films
2003 action drama films
Films directed by Francis Posadas